Caleel Harris (born April 19, 2003) is an American actor.

Career
He joined Nickelodeon in 2015, and voiced AJ from Blaze and the Monster Machines, then later in 2016, he provided the voice of Clyde McBride on The Loud House until season 3, where Andre Robinson succeeded him in the role due to Harris's puberty. Harris also played Duke in Think Like a Man and its sequel Think Like A Man Too.

Filmography
2010: Eyes to See - Haitian Boy
2011: Hawthorne - Michael Bourdet
2011: Herd Mentality - J.R.
2012: Think Like a Man - Duke
2013: Jimmy Kimmel Live! - Student
2013: Call Me Crazy: A Five Film - Quinn
2013: Sam & Cat - Boy #2
2013: Sidekick - AJ
2014: Men at Work - Young Gibbs
2014: Think Like a Man Too - Duke
2014: Kirby Buckets - Justin Hansen
2015: Boys in Blue - Tanner Bates
2015: Nicky, Ricky, Dicky & Dawn - Gilbert
2015: How Sarah Got Her Wings - Mason
2015–2018: Blaze and the Monster Machines - AJ (voice) ("Runaway Rocket"-Season 3)
2016-2018: The Loud House - Clyde McBride, Danny (voice) (Season 1-"Teachers' Union")
2016: Peanuts - Franklin (voice)
2017: Game Shakers - Young Double G
2017: Baker's Man - Young Thomas
2017: The Loud House: Deuces Wild - Clyde (voice)
2017: Skyward - Curtis
2017: NCIS: Los Angeles - Cooper
2017: Tree House Time Machine - Vincent
2018: Castle Rock - Young Henry Deaver
2018: Goosebumps 2: Haunted Halloween - Sam Carter
2019: When They See Us - Young Antron McCray
2021: Swagger - Musa Rahim

References

External links

Caleel Harris at Moviefone
Caleel Harris at Zap2it

2003 births
Living people
African-American male child actors
American male film actors
American male television actors
American male voice actors
Place of birth missing (living people)
21st-century American male actors
21st-century African-American people